Dušan Mladenović (born 13 October 1990) is a Serbian footballer who plays as a defender for Swedish club KSF Prespa Birlik.

Career
In the 2018/19 season, Mladenović played for both FK Budućnost Popovac and FK Tutin. In the summer 2019, Mladenović joined Swedish club KSF Prespa Birlik.

References

External links
 Dušan Mladenović  at serbiacorner.com
 
 
 

1990 births
Living people
People from Prokuplje
Serbian footballers
Association football defenders
FK Radnički Niš players
FK Sinđelić Niš players
FK Sloga Kraljevo players
FK Rudar Prijedor players
FC Alashkert players
FK Željezničar Sarajevo players
FK Iskra Danilovgrad players
FK Dinamo Vranje players
SFC Etar Veliko Tarnovo players
KSF Prespa Birlik players
Premier League of Bosnia and Herzegovina players
Armenian Premier League players
Montenegrin First League players
Serbian First League players
First Professional Football League (Bulgaria) players
Serbian expatriate footballers
Expatriate footballers in Bosnia and Herzegovina
Expatriate footballers in Armenia
Expatriate footballers in Montenegro
Expatriate footballers in Bulgaria
Expatriate footballers in Sweden
Serbian expatriate sportspeople in Bosnia and Herzegovina
Serbian expatriate sportspeople in Armenia
Serbian expatriate sportspeople in Montenegro
Serbian expatriate sportspeople in Bulgaria
Serbian expatriate sportspeople in Sweden